Antoine de Lonhy ( circa 1446–1490) was a painter, illuminator and glazier.

He received training in Burgundy, where he was also active as an artist before moving to Toulouse, Barcelona and later Savoy. He decorated the Saluces Hours, a book of hours currently in the British Library. In Barcelona, he designed an altarpiece and a rose window for the church of Santa Maria del Mar.

References

Stained glass artists and manufacturers
15th-century births
15th-century artists
Manuscript illuminators